Ella Enchanted is a Newbery Honor book written by Gail Carson Levine and published in 1997. The story is a retelling of Cinderella featuring various mythical creatures including fairies, elves, ogres, gnomes, and giants. In 2006, Levine went on to write Fairest, a retelling of the story of Snow White, set in the same world as Ella Enchanted. In 2018, Levine published Ogre Enchanted, a prequel to Ella Enchanted.

On April 9, 2004, a movie that is loosely based on the novel was released. It was directed by Tommy O'Haver and starred Anne Hathaway and Hugh Dancy as Ella and Prince Charmont, respectively. The film received mostly mixed reviews, and was heavily criticized for its changes to the source material and addition of new characters. Levine stated that the film is "so different from the book that it's hard to compare them" and suggested "regarding the movie as a separate creative act".

Summary
When Ella was just a baby, the fairy Lucinda bestowed the gift of obedience on her. When Ella is around fourteen, her mother dies. Her cook Mandy reveals herself to be her Fairy godmother. She is given two gifts by Mandy: a necklace from her mother and a magic book. At her mother's funeral, Ella meets the kingdom's prince, Char, who expresses fondness for her mother. At the wake, she is introduced to Dame Olga and her terrible daughters, Hattie and Olive. 

Her father, Peter, decides to send her to finishing school with the two mean sisters. Before leaving she visits her favorite places, where she meets Char again and they bond. At school, Hattie eventually discovers that Ella does whatever she is told and uses this for her own gain. She takes Ella's mother's necklace, then deprives Ella of food and orders her to end her friendship with her best friend Areida. Ella cannot stand this and sets out to find Lucinda so that she can reverse the spell. While leaving she discovers Hatties wig and takes it with. She uses the wig to buy food and get directions to her father (Who she saw the location of in her magic book) 

Ella comes upon the kingdom of Elves, who offer a warm welcome. The next morning, she awakens surrounded by ogres who plan on devouring her. She is given the command not to run away, so she is trapped, and stays up all night practicing Ogrese in hopes of using it on the ogres. It works and she talks them back to sleep, just in time for Char and his soldiers to apprehend them. One of his men is sent to escort Ella. 

Ella learns that ungrateful recipients of Lucinda's gifts often end up as squirrels and decides to use an alias when talking to her. Ella tells her she desires more mettle for she is too obedient, but Lucinda tells Ella to be happy and Ella is forced to feel happy because of her 'gift.' 

Ella learns from her father that he's lost everything so he must marry Dame Olga. At the wedding, Lucinda gifts the bride and groom eternal love. On the ride to Olga's house, Peter reveals that he's broke. Olga is livid, but due to Lucinda's gift, she is unable to stay angry at him. Instead she begins to transfer all of her hatred to Ella. Char comes to visit Ella but Hattie orders her to stay in her room. This continues until Char leaves for his trip. They start communicating via letters, which Ella has him address to Mandy so as not to arouse suspicion from her new step-family. When Peter leaves for work, Hattie reveals Ella's curse and Olga makes Ella work as a servant in the house. 

After months of communicating with each other, Ella and Char fall in love and Char wishes for her to be his queen. Ella realizes her curse could be very dangerous for him since he will one day be king. She decides they could never be together and writes a letter addressed from Hattie to mislead him into thinking she has run off with a rich earl. Mandy hates to see Ella so hurt and calls upon Lucinda to tell her to undo the gift of obedience in exchange for transforming her into a squirrel for three months.

During the next six months, Ella continues to endure the torment of her step-family. She learns that Char will be returning soon and three royal balls will be held. Lucinda comes back feeling horribly for Ella but is not able to lift the spell. Lucinda tells her she can only do it herself, but Lucinda will help. 

When Prince Char returns from his travels, Ella goes to the balls in disguise, with the help of Mandy and Lucinda. At the first ball, she dances with Char, who still wants to be with Ella after a chance meeting with Areida made him question the letter he received. On the third night, he introduces her to his parents and dances only with her. Hattie is jealous and unmasks Ella, causing her to flee and lose one of her glass slippers. Char finds the slipper and goes to her home. He asks her to tell him if she loves him, which she does. He then tells her to marry him and she accepts. 

Hattie orders her not to but Olga realizes with her curse and being queen, they could have anything, and demands she marry Char. Ella finds the strength to refuse her command, thus breaking Lucinda’s spell. Now Ella is able to marry Char on her own accord. Ella and Areida rekindle their friendship. Mandy becomes the castle cook and fairy godmother to Char and Ella's future children. Ella and Char live happily ever after.

Reception
In 2012 it was ranked number 85 on a list of the top 100 children's novels published by School Library Journal.

References

External links

Gail Carson Levine's official website

1997 American novels
1997 fantasy novels
American children's novels
American fantasy novels adapted into films
Fiction about curses
Novels about fairies and sprites
Novels about nobility
Novels about royalty
HarperCollins books
Books about magic
Newbery Honor-winning works
Novels based on fairy tales
Works based on Cinderella
Novels set in fictional countries
1997 children's books